Amritbani Guru Ravidass Ji is the holy book of the Ravidassia religion.

History
Amritbani Guru Ravidass Ji was compiled and edited by Ramanand Dass of Dera Sach Khand. The holy book's completion was announced by the Sant Samaj and by Dera Sach Khand at Shri Guru Ravidass Janam Asthan on 30 January 2011, the 633rd anniversary of the birth of Ravidas.

On 1 February 2012, the second anniversary of the creation of the Ravidassia religion, Amritbani Guru Ravidass Ji was placed at a shrine dedicated to Ravidass in Bootan Mandi, Jalandhar, Punjab.

Contents

Teachings
The Amritbani Guru Ravidass Ji contains bani of Ravidass. The title page features the Har Nishaan symbol and a statement enjoining readers to wish each other "Jai Gurdev". The book contains photos of Ravidass and of Shri Guru Ravidass Janam Asthan. The book also includes a list of the teachings of Ravidass and general principles of the Ravidassia religion.

Ragas
Amritbani Guru Ravidass Ji contains 240 ragas culled from Ravidass' teachings. The book also contains 140 shabads, 40 pade, painti akhri, bani haftawar, bani pandran tithi, baran maas updesh, dohra, saand bani, anmol vachan (milni de samen), laawaan, suhag ustat, manglachar, and 231 salok. There are 177 pages in the book. Ragas from Amritbani Guru Ravidass Ji are recited daily in Ravidassia bhawans. The original language of Amritbani Guru Ravidass Ji is Gurmukhi , the mother tongue of Shri Guru Ravidass , Punjabi other language translations have also been published.

References 

Indian religious texts
Ravidassia